Justan Rural District is in Bala Taleqan District of Taleqan County, Alborz province, Iran. At the latest census in 2016, the population was 4,193 people in 1,622 households. The largest of its 26 villages was Dizan, with 665 inhabitants.

At the time of the 2006 census (prior to the formation of the rural district in Taleqan County), its constituent villages were in the former Taleqan District of Savojbolagh County, Tehran province. Their total population was 4,602.

References 

Taleqan County

Rural Districts of Alborz Province

Populated places in Alborz Province

Populated places in Taleqan County

fa:دهستان جوستان